Alangium villosum is a species of flowering plant in the family Cornaceae, native to Java.

Subtaxa
It was previously considered to contain ten described and one undescribed subspecies, but these were split out to their own species, such as the Australian Alangium villosum subsp. polyosmoides, which is now Alangium polyosmoides.

References

villosum
Endemic flora of Java
Plants described in 1906